Valentim Gentil is a municipality in the state of São Paulo, Brazil. The city has a population of 13,532 inhabitants and an area of 149.7 km².

Valentim Gentil belongs to the Mesoregion of São José do Rio Preto.

References

Municipalities in São Paulo (state)